Greatest Hits Live is a bootleg live album of British progressive rock band Yes.

Track listing
"Owner of a Lonely Heart" (Chris Squire, Jon Anderson, Trevor Horn, Trevor Rabin) – 5:58  (from 90125)
"Homeworld (The Ladder)" (Alan White, Billy Sherwood, Chris Squire, Igor Khoroshev, Jon Anderson, Steve Howe) – 9:33
"Open Your Eyes" (Jon Anderson, Steve Howe, Billy Sherwood, Chris Squire, Alan White) – 5:13  (from Open Your Eyes)
"Awaken" (Jon Anderson, Steve Howe) – 17:02 (from Going for the One)
"Spirit of Survival" (Alan White, Chris Squire, Jon Anderson, Steve Howe) – 5:59
"Yours Is No Disgrace" (Bill Bruford, Chris Squire, Jon Anderson, Steve Howe, Tony Kaye) – 12:55  (from The Yes Album)
"New Language" (Alan White, Billy Sherwood, Chris Squire, Igor Khoroshev, Jon Anderson, Steve Howe) – 9:20
"Roundabout" (Jon Anderson/Steve Howe) – 7:28  (from Fragile)

References 

Yes (band) live albums
Yes (band) compilation albums
2006 live albums
2006 compilation albums